The Chiangmai Golf Classic was a golf tournament on the Asian Tour. It was first played in 2013 at the Alpine Golf Resort-Chiangmai in Chiang Mai, Thailand.

Winners

References

External links

Coverage on the Asian Tour's official site

Former Asian Tour events
Golf tournaments in Thailand
Sport in Chiang Mai
2013 in Chiang Mai